Qanyah is a sub-district located in Radman Al Awad District, Al Bayda Governorate, Yemen.  Qanyah had a population of 2806 according to the 2004 census.

References 

Sub-districts in Radman Al Awad District